The NATO Item Identification Number or National Item Identification Number (NIIN) is a 9-digit alphanumeric code created by the NATO Codification Bureaux to designate unique items of supply.

The NATO Stock Number or National Stock Number (NSN) is a 13-digit alphanumeric code consisting of a Group of Supply, a Class of Supply and the unique NIIN to designate unique items of supply grouped by their relative catalog category.
   
The first four digits are the NATO Supply Classification (NSC) or Federal Supply Class (FSC) code. The first two digits are the NATO Supply Group (NSG) or Federal Supply Group (FSG).

Examples:

Group 10: Weapons
1005: Weapons (from 1 mm through 30 mm).
1010: Weapons (from 31 mm to 75 mm).
1015: Weapons (from 76 mm to 125 mm).
1020: Weapons (from 126 mm to 150 mm).
1025: Weapons (from 151 mm to 300 mm).
1030: Weapons (from 300 mm+).
1040: Chemical Weapons and Equipment.
1045: Launchers, Torpedo and Depth Charge
1055: Launchers, Rocket and Pyrotechnic
1070: Nets and Booms, Ordnance
1075: Degaussing and Mine Sweeping Equipment
1080: Camouflage and Deception Equipment
1090: Assemblies Interchangeable Between Weapons in Two or More Classes

Group 11: Nuclear Ordnance
1105: Nuclear Bombs
1110: Nuclear Projectiles
1115: Nuclear Warheads and Warhead Sections
1120: Nuclear Depth Charges
1125: Nuclear Demolition Charges
1127: Nuclear Rockets
1130: Conversion Kits, Nuclear Ordnance
1135: Fusing and Firing Devices, Nuclear Ordnance
1140: Nuclear Components
1145: Explosive and Pyrotechnic Components, Nuclear Ordnance
1190: Specialized Test and Handling Equipment, Nuclear Ordnance
1195: Miscellaneous Nuclear Ordnance

Group 12: Fire Control Equipment
1210: Fire Control Directors
1220: Fire Control Computing Sights and Devices
1230: Fire Control Systems, Complete
1240: Optical Sighting and Ranging Equipment
1250: Fire Control Stabilizing Mechanisms
1260: Fire Control Designating and Indicating Equipment
1265: Fire Control Transmitting and Receiving Equipment, except Airborne
1270: Aircraft Gunnery Fire Control Components
1280: Aircraft Bombing Fire Control Components
1285: Fire Control Radar Equipment, except Airborne
1287: Fire Control Sonar Equipment
1290: Miscellaneous Fire Control Equipment

Group 13: Ammunition and Explosives
1305: Ammunition, through 30mm (1mm - 30mm)
1310: Ammunition, over 30mm through 75mm (31mm-75mm)
1315: Ammunition, over 75mm through 125mm (76mm - 125mm)
1320: Ammunition, over 125mm (126mm +)
1325: Bombs
1330: Grenades
1336: Guided Missile Warheads and Explosive Components
1337: Guided Missile and Space Vehicle Explosive Propulsion Units, Solid Fuel; and Components
1338: Guided Missile and Space Vehicle Inert Propulsion Units, Solid Fuel; and Components.
1340: Rockets, Rocket Ammunition and Rocket Components
1345: Land Mines
1350: Underwater Mine and Components, Inert
1351: Underwater Mines and Components, Explosive
1352: Underwater Mine Disposal Inert Devices
1353: Underwater Mine Disposal Explosive Devices
1355: Torpedoes and Components, Inert
1356: Torpedoes and Components, Explosive
1360: Depth Charges and Components, Inert
1361: Depth Charges and Components, Explosive
1365: Military Chemical Agents
1370: Pyrotechnics
1375: Demolition Materials
1376: Bulk Explosives
1377: Cartridge and Propellant Actuated Devices and Components
1385: Surface Use Explosive Ordnance Disposal Tools and Equipment
1386: Underwater Use Explosive Ordnance Disposal and Swimmer Weapons Systems Tools and Equipment
1390: Fuzes and Primers
1395: Miscellaneous Ammunition
1398: Specialized Ammunition Handling and Servicing Equipment

Group 14: Guided Missiles
1410: Guided Missiles 
1420: Guided Missile Components 
1425: Guided Missile Systems, Complete 
1427: Guided Missile Sub-systems 
1430: Guided Missile Remote Control Systems
1440: Launchers, Guided Missile
1450: Guided Missile Handling and Servicing Equipment

Group 15: Aircraft and Airframe Structural Components
1510: Aircraft, Fixed Wing
1520: Aircraft, Rotary Wing
1540: Gliders
1550: Unmanned Aircraft
1560: Airframe Structural Components

Group 16: Aircraft Components and Accessories
1610: Aircraft Propellers and Components
1615: Helicopter Rotor Blades, Drive Mechanisms and Components
1620: Aircraft Landing Gear Components
1630: Aircraft Wheel and Brake Systems
1640: Aircraft Control Cable Products
1650: Aircraft Hydraulic, Vacuum, and De-icing System Components
1660: Aircraft Air Conditioning, Heating, and Pressurizing Equipment
1670: Parachutes; Aerial Pick Up, Delivery, Recovery Systems; and Cargo Tie Down Equipment
1680: Miscellaneous Aircraft Accessories and Components

Group 17: Aircraft Launching, Landing, and Ground Handling Equipment
1710: Aircraft Landing Equipment
1720: Aircraft Launching Equipment
1730: Aircraft Ground Servicing Equipment
1740: Airfield Specialized Trucks and Trailers

Group 18: Space Vehicles
1810: Space Vehicles
1820: Space Vehicle Components
1830: Space Vehicle Remote Control Systems
1840: Space Vehicle Launchers
1850: Space Vehicle Handling and Servicing Equipment
1860: Space Survival Equipment

Group 19: Ships, Small Craft, Pontoons, and Floating Docks
1905: Combat Ships and Landing Vessels
1910: Transport Vessels, Passenger and Troop
1915: Cargo and Tanker Vessels
1920: Fishing Vessels
1925: Special Service Vessels
1930: Barges and Lighters, Cargo
1935: Barges and Lighters, Special Purpose
1940: Small Craft
1945: Pontoons and Floating Docks
1950: Floating Drydocks
1955: Dredges
1990: Miscellaneous Vessels

Group 20: Ship and Marine Equipment
2010: Ship and Boat Propulsion Components
2020: Rigging and Rigging Gear
2030: Deck Machinery
2040: Marine Hardware and Hull Items
2050: Buoys
2060: Commercial Fishing Equipment
2090: Miscellaneous Ship and Marine Equipment

Group 22: Railway Equipment
2210: Locomotives
2220: Rail Cars
2230: Right-of-Way Construction and Maintenance Equipment, Railroad
2240: Locomotive and Rail Car Accessories and Components
2250: Track Material, Railroad

Group 23: Ground Effect Vehicles, Motor Vehicles, Trailers, and Cycles
2305: Ground Effect Vehicles
2310: Passenger Motor Vehicles
2320: Trucks and Truck Tractors, Wheeled
2330: Trailers
2340: Motorcycles, Motor Scooters, and Bicycles
2350: Combat, Assault, and Tactical Vehicles, Tracked
2355: Combat, Assault, and Tactical Vehicles, Wheeled

Group 24: Tractors
2410: Tractor, Full Tracked, Low Speed
2420: Tractors, Wheeled
2430: Tractors, Full Tracked, High Speed

Group 25: Vehicular Equipment Components
2510: Vehicular Cab, Body, and Frame Structural Components
2520: Vehicular Power Transmission Components
2530: Vehicular Brake, Steering, Axle, Wheel, and Track Components
2540: Vehicular Furniture and Accessories
2541: Weapons Systems Specific Vehicular Accessories
2590: Miscellaneous Vehicular Components

Group 26: Tires and Tubes
2610: Tires and Tubes, Pneumatic, Except Aircraft
2620: Tires and Tubes, Pneumatic, Aircraft
2630: Tires, Solid and Cushion
2640: Tire Rebuilding and Tire and Tube Repair Materials

Group 28: Engines, Turbines, and Components
2805: Gasoline Reciprocating Engines, Except Aircraft; and Components
2810: Gasoline Reciprocating Engines, Aircraft Prime Mover; and Components
2815: Diesel Engines and Components
2820: Steam Engines, Reciprocating; and Components
2825: Steam Turbines and Components
2830: Water Turbines and Water Wheels; and Components
2835: Gas Turbines and Jet Engines; Non-Aircraft Prime Mover, Aircraft Non-Prime Mover, and Components
2840: Gas Turbines and Jet Engines, Aircraft, Prime Moving; and Components
2845: Rocket Engines and Components
2850: Gasoline Rotary Engines and Components
2895: Miscellaneous Engines and Components

Group 29: Engine Accessories
2910: Engine Fuel System Components, Nonaircraft
2915: Engine Fuel System Components, Aircraft and Missile Prime Movers
2920: Engine Electrical System Components, Nonaircraft
2925: Engine Electrical System Components, Aircraft Prime Moving
2930: Engine Cooling System Components, Nonaircraft
2935: Engine System Cooling Components, Aircraft Prime Moving
2940: Engine Air and Oil Filters, Strainers, and Cleaners, Nonaircraft
2945: Engine Air and Oil Filters, Cleaners, Aircraft Prime Moving
2950: Turbo Supercharger and Components
2990: Miscellaneous Engine Accessories, Nonaircraft
2995: Miscellaneous Engine Accessories, Aircraft

Group 30: Mechanical Power Transmission Equipment
3010: Torque Converters and Speed Changers
3020: Gears, Pulleys, Sprockets, and Transmission Chain
3030: Belting, Drive Belts, Fan Belts, and Accessories
3040: Miscellaneous Power Transmission Equipment

Group 31: Bearings
3110: Ball Bearings, Anti-Friction, Unmounted
3120: Bearings, Plain, Unmounted
3130: Bearings, Mounted
3140: Bearings, Spherical roller

Group 32: Woodworking Machinery and Equipment
3210: Sawmill and Planing Mill Machinery
3220: Woodworking Machines
3230: Tools and Attachments for Woodworking Machinery

Group 33: Historical FSG (used for file maintenance purposes only)
3365: Historical FSC
3375: Historical FSC

Group 34:Metalworking Machinery
3405: Saws and Filing Machines
3408: Machining Centers and Way-Type Machines
3410: Electrical and Ultrasonic Erosion Machines
3411: Boring Machines
3412: Broaching Machines
3413: Drilling and Tapping Machines
3414: Gear Cutting and Finishing Machines
3415: Grinding Machines
3416: Lathes
3417: Milling Machines
3418: Planers and Shapers
3419: Miscellaneous Machine Tools
3422: Rolling Mills and Drawing Machines
3424: Metal Heat Treating and Non-Thermal Treating Equipment
3426: Metal Finishing Equipment
3431: Electric Arc Welding Equipment
3432: Electric Resistance Welding Equipment
3433: Gas Welding, Heat Cutting, and Metalizing Equipment
3436: Welding Positioners and Manipulators
3438: Miscellaneous Welding Equipment
3439: Miscellaneous Welding, Soldering, and Brazing Supplies and Accessories
3441: Bending and Forming Machines
3442: Hydraulic and Pneumatic Presses, Power Driven
3443: Mechanical Presses, Power Driven
3444: Manual Presses
3445: Punching and Shearing Machines
3446: Forging Machinery and Hammers
3447: Wire and Metal Ribbon Forming Machines
3448: Riveting Machines
3449: Miscellaneous Secondary Metal Forming and Cutting Machines
3450: Machine Tools, Portable
3455: Cutting Tools for Machine Tools
3456: Cutting and Forming Tools for Secondary Metalworking Machinery
3460: Machine Tool accessories
3461: Accessories for Secondary Metalworking Machinery
3465: Production Jigs, Fixtures, and Templates
3470: Machine Shop Sets, Kits, and Outfits

Group 35: Service and Trade Equipment
3510: Laundry and Dry Cleaning Equipment
3520: Shoe Repairing Equipment
3530: Industrial Sewing Machines and Mobile Textile Repair Shops
3540: Wrapping and Packaging Machinery
3550: Vending and Coin Operated Machines
3590: Miscellaneous Service and Trade Equipment

Group 36: Special Industry Machinery
3605: Food Products Machinery and Equipment
3610: Printing, Duplicating, and Bookbinding Equipment
3611: Industrial Marking Machines
3615: Pulp and Paper Industries Machinery
3620: Rubber and Plastics Working Machinery
3625: Textile Industries Machinery
3630: Clay and Concrete Products Industries Machinery
3635: Crystal and Glass Industries Machinery
3640: Tobacco Manufacturing Machinery
3645: Leather Tanning and Leather Working Industries Machinery
3650: Chemical and Pharmaceutical Products Manufacturing Machinery
3655: Gas Generating and Dispensing Systems, Fixed or Mobile
3660: Industrial Size Reduction Machinery
3670: Specialized Semiconductor, Microcircuit, and Printed Circuit Board Manufacturing Machinery
3680: Foundry Machinery, Related Equipment and Supplies
3685: Specialized Metal Container Manufacturing Machinery and Related Equipment
3690: Specialized Ammunition and Ordnance Machinery and Related Equipment
3693: Industrial Assembly Machines
3694: Clean Work Stations, Controlled Environment, and Related Equipment
3695: Miscellaneous Special Industry Machinery

Group 37: Agricultural Machinery and Equipment
3710: Soil Preparation Equipment
3720: Harvesting Equipment
3730: Dairy, Poultry, and Livestock Equipment
3740: Pest, Disease, and Frost Control Equipment
3750: Gardening Implements and Tools
3760: Animal Drawn Vehicles and Farm Trailers
3770: Saddlery, Harness, Whips, and Related Animal Furnishings

Group 38: Construction, Mining, Excavating, and Highway Maintenance Equipment
3805: Earth Moving and Excavating Equipment
3810: Cranes and Crane-Shovels
3815: Crane and Crane-Shovel Attachments
3820: Mining, Rock Drilling, Earth Boring, and Related Equipment
3825: Road Clearing, Cleaning, and Marking Equipment
3830: Truck and Tractor Attachments
3835: Petroleum Production and Distribution Equipment
3895: Miscellaneous Construction Equipment

Group 39: Materials Handling Equipment
3910: Conveyors
3915: Materials Feeders
3920: Material Handling Equipment, Nonself-Propelled
3930: Warehouse Trucks and Tractors, Self-Propelled
3940: Blocks, Tackle, Rigging, and Slings
3950: Winches, Hoists, Cranes, and Derricks
3960: Freight Elevators
3990: Miscellaneous Materials Handling Equipment

Group 40: Rope, Cable, Chain, and Fittings
4010: Chain and Wire Rope
4020: Fiber Rope, Cordage, and Twine
4030: Fittings for Rope, Cable, and Chain

Group 41: Refrigeration, Air Conditioning, and Air Circulating Equipment
4110: Refrigeration Equipment
4120: Air Conditioning Equipment
4130: Refrigeration and Air Conditioning Components
4140: Fans, Air Circulators, and Blower Equipment
4150: Vortex Tubes and Other Related Cooling Tubes

Group 42: Fire Fighting, Rescue, and Safety Equipment; and Environmental Protection Equipment and Materials
4210: Fire Fighting Equipment
4220: Marine Lifesaving and Diving Equipment
4230: Decontaminating and Impregnating Equipment
4235: Hazardous Material Spill Containment and Clean-up Equipment and Material
4240: Safety and Rescue Equipment
4250: Recycling and Reclamation Equipment

Group 43: Pumps and Compressors
4310: Compressors and Vacuum Pumps
4320: Power and Hand Pumps
4330: Centrifugals, Separators, and Pressure and Vacuum Filters

Group 44: Furnace, Steam Plant, and Drying Equipment; and Nuclear Reactors
4410: Industrial Boilers
4420: Heat Exchangers and Steam Condensers
4430: Industrial Furnaces, Kilns, Lehrs, and Ovens
4440: Driers, Dehydrators, and Anhydrators
4460: Air Purification Equipment 
4470: Nuclear Reactors

Group 45: Plumbing, Heating, and Waste Disposal Equipment
4510: Plumbing Fixtures and Accessories
4520: Space and Water Heating Equipment
4530: Fuel Burning Equipment Units
4540: Waste Disposal Equipment

Group 46: Water Purification and Sewage Treatment Equipment
4610: Water Purification Equipment
4620: Water Distillation Equipment, Marine and Industrial
4630: Sewage Treatment Equipment

Group 47: Pipe, Tubing, Hose, and Fittings
4710: Pipe, Tube and Rigid Tubing
4720: Hose and Flexible Tubing
4730: Hose, Pipe, Tube, Lubrication, and Railing Fittings

Group 48: Valves
4810: Valves, Powered
4820: Valves, Nonpowered

Group 49: Maintenance and Repair Shop Equipment
4910: Motor Vehicle Maintenance and Repair Shop Specialized Equipment
4920: Aircraft Maintenance and Repair Shop Specialized Equipment
4921: Torpedo Maintenance, Repair, and Checkout Specialized Equipment
4923: Depth Charges and Underwater Mines Maintenance, Repair, and Checkout Specialized Equipment
4925: Ammunition Maintenance, Repair, and Checkout Specialized Equipment
4927: Rocket Maintenance, Repair and Checkout Specialized Equipment
4930: Lubrication and Fuel Dispensing Equipment
4931: Fire Control Maintenance and Repair Shop Specialized Equipment
4933: Weapons Maintenance and Repair Shop Specialized Equipment
4935: Guided Missile Maintenance, Repair, and Checkout Specialized Equipment
4940: Miscellaneous Maintenance and Repair Shop Specialized Equipment
4960: Space Vehicle Maintenance, Repair, and Checkout Specialized Equipment
4970: Multiple Guided Weapons, Specialized Maintenance and Repair Shop Equipment

Group 51: Hand Tools
5110: Hand Tools, Edged, Non-powered
5120: Hand Tools, Non-edged, Non-powered
5130: Hand Tools, Power Driven
5133: Drill Bits, Counterbores, and Countersinks: Hand and Machine
5136: Taps, Dies, and Collets; Hand and Machine
5140: Tool and Hardware Boxes
5180: Sets, Kits, and Outfits of Hand Tools

Group 52: Measuring Tools
5210: Measuring Tools, Craftsmen's
5220: Inspection Gages and Precision Layout Tools
5280: Sets, Kits, and Outfits of Measuring Tools

Group 53: Hardware and Abrasives
5305: Screws
5306: Bolts
5307: Studs
5310: Nuts and Washers
5315: Nails, Machine Keys, and Pins
5320: Rivets
5325: Fastening Devices
5330: Packing and Gasket Materials
5331: O-Ring
5335: Metal Screening
5340: Hardware, Commercial
5341: Brackets
5342: Hardware, Weapon System
5345: Disks and Stones, Abrasive
5350: Abrasive Materials
5355: Knobs and Pointers
5360: Coil, Flat, Leaf, and Wire Springs
5365: Bushings, Rings, Shims, and Spacers

Group 54: Prefabricated Structures and Scaffolding
5410: Prefabricated and Portable Buildings 
5411: Rigid Wall Shelters
5419: Collective Modular Support System
5420: Bridges, Fixed and Floating
5430: Storage Tanks
5440: Scaffolding Equipment and Concrete Forms
5445: Prefabricated Tower Structures
5450: Miscellaneous Prefabricated Structures

Group 55: Lumber, Millwork, Plywood, and Veneer
5510: Lumber and Related Basic Wood Materials
5520: millwork
5530: Plywood and Veneer

Group 56: Construction and Building Materials
5610: Mineral Construction Materials, Bulk
5620: Tile, Brick and Block
5630: Pipe and Conduit, Nonmetallic
5640: Wallboard, Building Paper, and Thermal Insulation Materials
5650: Roofing and Siding Materials
5660: Fencing, Fences, Gates and Components
5670: Building Components, Prefabricated
5675: Non-wood Construction Lumber and Related Materials
5680: Miscellaneous Construction Materials

Group 58: Communication, Detection, and Coherent Radiation Equipment
5805: Telephone and Telegraph Equipment
5810: Communications Security Equipment and Components
5811: Other Cryptologic Equipment and Components
5815: Teletype and Facsimile Equipment
5820: Radio and Television Communication Equipment, Except Airborne
5821: Radio and Television Communication Equipment, Airborne
5825: Radio Navigation Equipment, Except Airborne
5826: Radio Navigation Equipment, Airborne
5830: Intercommunication and Public Address Systems, Except Airborne
5831: Intercommunication and Public Address Systems, Airborne
5835: Sound Recording and Reproducing Equipment
5836: Video Recording and Reproducing Equipment
5840: Radar Equipment, Except Airborne
5841: Radar Equipment, Airborne
5845: Underwater Sound Equipment
5850: Visible and Invisible Light Communication Equipment
5855: Night Vision Equipment, Emitted and Reflected Radiation
5860: Stimulated Coherent Radiation Devices, Components, and Accessories
5865: Electronic Countermeasures, Counter-Countermeasures, and Quick Reaction Capability Equipment
5895: Miscellaneous Communication Equipment

Group 59: Electrical and Electronic Equipment Components
5905: Resistors
5910: Capacitors
5915: Filters and Networks
5920: Fuses, Arrestors, Absorbers, and Protectors
5925: Circuit Breakers
5930: Switches
5935: Connectors, Electrical
5940: Lugs, Terminals, and Terminal Strips
5945: Relays and Solenoids
5950: Coils and Transformers
5955: Oscillators and Piezoelectric Crystals
5960: Electron Tubes and Associated Hardware
5961: Semiconductor Devices and Associated Hardware
5962: Microcircuits, Electronic
5963: Electronic Modules
5965: Headsets, Handsets, Microphones and Speakers
5970: Electrical Insulators and Insulating Materials
5975: Electrical Hardware and Supplies
5977: Electrical Contact Brushes and Electrodes
5980: Optoelectronic Devices and Associated Hardware
5985: Antennas, Waveguides, and Related Equipment
5990: Synchros and Resolvers
5995: Cable, Cord, and Wire Assemblies: Communication Equipment
5996: Amplifiers
5998: Electrical and Electronic assemblies, Boards, Cards, and Associated Hardware
5999: Miscellaneous Electrical and Electronic Components

Group 60: Fiber Optics Materials, Components, Assemblies, and Accessories
6004: Rotary Joints
6005: Couplers, Splitters, and Mixers 
6006: Attenuators 
6007: Filters
6008: Optical Multiplexers/Demultiplexers 
6010: Fiber Optic Conductors
6015: Fiber Optic Cables
6020: Fiber Optic Cable Assemblies and Harnesses
6021: Fiber Optic Switches
6025: Fiber Optic Transmitters
6026: Fiber Optic Receivers 
6029: Optical Repeaters
6030: Fiber Optic Devices
6031: Integrated Optical Circuits 
6032: Fiber Optic Light Sources and Photo Detectors
6033: Fiber Optic Photo Detectors 
6034: Fiber Optic Modulators/Demodulators 
6035: Fiber Optic Light Transfer and Image Transfer Devices
6040: Fiber Optic Sensors
6050: Fiber Optic Passive Devices 
6060: Fiber Optic Interconnectors
6070: Fiber Optic Accessories and Supplies
6080: Fiber Optic Kits and Sets
6099: Miscellaneous Fiber Optic Components

Group 61: Electric Wire, and Power and Distribution Equipment
6105: Motors, Electrical
6110: Electrical Control Equipment
6115: Generators and Generator Sets, Electrical
6116: Fuel Cell Power Units, Components, and Accessories
6117: Solar Electric Power Systems
6120: Transformers: Distribution and Power Station
6125: Converters, Electrical, Rotating
6130: Converters, Electrical, Nonrotating
6135: Batteries, Non-rechargeable
6140: Batteries, Rechargeable
6145: Wire and Cable, Electrical
6150: Miscellaneous Electric Power and Distribution Equipment
6160: Miscellaneous Battery Retaining Fixtures, Liners and Ancillary Items

Group 62: Lighting Fixtures and Lamps
6210 - Indoor and Outdoor Electric Lighting Fixtures
6220 - Electric Vehicular Lights and Fixtures
6230 - Electric Portable and Hand Lighting Equipment
6240 - Electric Lamps
6250 - Ballasts, Lampholders, and Starters
6260 - Non-Electrical Lighting Fixtures

Group 63: Alarm, Signal and Security Detection Systems
6310: Traffic and Transit Signal Systems
6320: Shipboard Alarm and Signal Systems
6330: Railroad Signal and Warning Devices
6340: Aircraft Alarm and Signal Systems
6350: Miscellaneous Alarm, Signal, and Security Detection Systems

Group 65: Medical, Dental, and Veterinary Equipment and Supplies
6505: Drugs and Biologicals
6508: Medicated Cosmetics and Toiletries
6509: Drugs and Biologicals, Veterinary Use
6510: Surgical Dressing Materials
6515: Medical and Surgical Instruments, Equipment, and Supplies
6520: Dental Instruments, Equipment, and Supplies
6525: Imaging Equipment and Supplies: Medical, Dental, Veterinary
6530: Hospital Furniture, Equipment, Utensils, and Supplies
6532: Hospital and Surgical Clothing and Related Special Purpose Items
6540: Ophthalmic Instruments, Equipment, and Supplies
6545: Replenishable Field Medical Sets, Kits, and Outfits
6550: In Vitro Diagnostic Substances, Reagents, Test Kits and Sets

Group 66: Instruments and Laboratory Equipment
6605: Navigational Instruments
6610: Flight Instruments
6615: Automatic Pilot Mechanisms and Airborne Gyro Components
6620: Engine Instruments
6625: Electrical and Electronic Properties Measuring and Testing Instruments
6630: Chemical Analysis Instruments
6635: Physical Properties Testing and Inspection
6636: Environmental Chambers and Related Equipment
6640: Laboratory Equipment and Supplies
6645: Time Measuring Instruments
6650: Optical Instruments, Test Equipment, Components and Accessories
6655: Geophysical Instruments
6660: Meteorological Instruments and Apparatus
6665: Hazard-Detecting Instruments and Apparatus
6670: Scales and Balances
6675: Drafting, Surveying, and Mapping Instruments
6680: Liquid and Gas Flow, Liquid Level, and Mechanical Motion Measuring Instruments
6685: Pressure, Temperature, and Humidity Measuring and Controlling Instruments
6695: Combination and Miscellaneous Instruments

Group 67: Photographic Equipment
6710: Cameras, Motion Picture
6720: Cameras, Still Picture
6730: Photographic Projection Equipment
6740: Photographic Developing and Finishing Equipment
6750: Photographic Supplies
6760: Photographic Equipment and Accessories
6770: Film, Processed
6780: Photographic Sets, Kits, and Outfits

Group 68: Chemicals and Chemical Products
6810: Chemicals 
6820: Dyes
6830: Gases: Compressed and Liquefied
6840: Pest Control Agents and Disinfectants
6850: Miscellaneous Chemical Specialties

Group 69: Training Aids and Devices
6910: Training Aids
6920: Armament Training Devices
6930: Operation Training Devices
6940: Communication Training Devices

Group 70: Automatic Data Processing Equipment (Including Firmware), Software, Supplies and Support Equipment
7010: ADPE System Configuration
7020: ADP Central Processing Unit (CPU, Computer), Analog
7021: ADP Central Processing Unit (CPU, Computer), Digital
7022: ADP Central Processing Unit (CPU, Computer), Hybrid
7025: ADP Input/ Output and Storage Devices
7030: ADP Software
7035: ADP Support Equipment
7040: Punched Card Equipment
7042: Mini and Micro Computer Control Devices
7045: ADP Supplies
7050: ADP Components

Group 71: Furniture
7105: Household Furniture
7110: Office Furniture
7125: Cabinets, Lockers, Bins, and Shelving
7195: Miscellaneous Furniture and Fixtures

Group 72: Household and Commercial Furnishings and Appliances
7210: Household Furnishings
7220: Floor Coverings
7230: Draperies, Awnings, and Shades
7240: Household and Commercial Utility Containers
7290: Miscellaneous Household and Commercial Furnishings and Appliances

Group 73: Food Preparation and Serving Equipment
7310: Food Cooking, Baking, and Serving Equipment
7320: Kitchen Equipment and Appliances
7330: Kitchen Hand Tools and Utensils
7340: Cutlery and Flatware
7350: Tableware
7360: Sets, Kits, Outfits and Modules, Food Preparation and Serving

Group 74: Office Machines, Text Processing Systems and Visible Record Equipment
7420: Accounting and Calculating Machines
7430: Typewriters and Office Type Composing Machines
7435: Office Information System Equipment
7450: Office Type Sound Recording and Reproducing Machines
7460: Visible Record Equipment
7490: Miscellaneous Office Machines

Group 75: Office Supplies and Devices
7510: Office Supplies
7520: Office Devices and Accessories
7530: Stationery and Record Forms
7540: Standard Forms

Group 76: Books, Maps, and Other Publications
7610: Books and Pamphlets
7630: Newspapers and Periodicals
7640: Maps, Atlases, Charts, and Globes
7641: Aeronautical Maps, Charts and Geodetic Products
7642: Hydrographic Maps, Charts and Geodetic Products
7643: Topographic Maps, Charts and Geodetic Products
7644: Digital Maps, Charts and Geodetic Products
7650: Drawings and Specifications
7660: Sheet and Book Music
7670: Microfilm, Processed
7690: Miscellaneous Printed Matter

Group 77: Musical Instruments, Phonographs, and Home-Type Radios
7710: Musical Instruments
7720: Musical Instrument Parts and Accessories
7730: Phonographs, Radios, and Television Sets: Home Type
7735: Parts and Accessories of Phonographs, Radios, and Television Set: Home Type
7740: Phonograph Records

Group 78: Recreational and Athletic Equipment
7810: Athletic and Sporting Equipment
7820: Games, Toys, and Wheeled Goods
7830: Recreational and Gymnastic Equipment

Group 79: Cleaning Equipment and Supplies
7910: Floor Polishers and Vacuum Cleaning Equipment
7920: Brooms, Brushes, Mops, and Sponges
7930: Cleaning and Polishing Compounds and Preparations

Group 80: Brushes, Paints, Sealers, and Adhesives
8010 - Paint (there are different NSNs for Full Gloss, Semi-Gloss, or Flat versions of the same shade and different NSNs for amounts in pint- or gallon-sized paint cans and 10 oz. or 16 oz. spray paint cans).
8020 - Paint and Artists' Brushes
8030 - Preservative and Sealing Compounds
8040 - Adhesives

Group 81: Containers, Packaging, and Packing Supplies
8105: Bags and Sacks
8110: Drums and Cans
8115: Boxes, Cartons, and Crates
8120: Commercial and Industrial Gas Cylinders
8125: Bottles and Jars
8130: Reels and Spools
8135: Packaging and Packing Bulk Materials
8140: Ammunition and Nuclear Ordnance Boxes, Packages and Special Containers
8145: Specialized Shipping and Storage Containers
8150: Freight Containers

Group 83: Textiles, Leather and Furs, Apparel and Shoe Findings, Tents, and Flags
8305: Textile Fabrics
8310 - Yarn and Thread
8315 - Notions and Apparel Findings
8320 - Padding and Stuffing Materials
8325 - Fur Materials
8330 - Leather Materials
8335 - Shoe Findings and Soling Materials
8340 - Tents and Tarpaulins
8345 - Flags and Pennants

Group 84: Clothing, Individual Equipment, and Insignia
8405: Outerwear, Men's 
8410: Outerwear, Women's
8415: Clothing, Special Purpose
8420: Underwear and Nightwear, Men's
8425: Underwear and Nightwear, Women's
8430: Footwear, Men's
8435: Footwear, Women's
8440: Hosiery, Handwear, and Clothing Accessories, Men's
8445: Hosiery, Handwear, and Clothing Accessories, Women's
8450: Children's and Infants' Apparel and Accessories
8455: Badges and Insignia
8460: Luggage
8465: Individual Equipment
8470: Armor, Personal
8475: Specialized Flight Clothing and Accessories

Group 85: Toiletries
8510: Perfumes, Toilet Preparations, and Powders
8520: Toilet Soap, Shaving Preparations, and Dentifrices
8530: Personal Toiletry Articles
8540: Toiletry Paper Products

Group 87: Agricultural Supplies
8710: Forage and Feed
8720: Fertilizers
8730: Seeds and Nursery Stock

Group 88: Live Animals
8810: Live Animals, Raised for Food.
8820: Live Animals, Not Raised for Food.

Group 89: Subsistence
8905: Meat, Poultry, and Fish
8910: Dairy Foods and Eggs
8915: Fruits and Vegetables
8920: Bakery and Cereal Products
8925: Sugar, Confectionery, and Nuts
8930: Jams, Jellies, and Preserves
8935: Soups and Bouillons
8940: Special Dietary Foods and Food Specialty Preparations
8945: Food, Oils and Fats
8950: Condiments and Related Products
8955: Coffee, Tea, and Cocoa
8960: Beverages, Nonalcoholic
8965: Beverages, Alcoholic
8970: Composite Food Packages
8975: Tobacco Products

Group 91: Fuels, Lubricants, Oils, and Waxes
9110: Fuels, Solid
9130: Liquid Propellants and Fuels, Petroleum Base
9135: Liquid Propellant Fuels and Oxidizers, Chemical Base
9140: Fuel Oils
9150: Oils and Greases: Cutting, Lubricating, and Hydraulic
9160: Miscellaneous Waxes, Oils, and Fats

Group 93: Nonmetallic Fabricated Materials
9310: Paper and Paperboard
9320: Rubber Fabricated Materials
9330: Plastics Fabricated Materials
9340: Glass Fabricated Materials
9350: Refractories and Fire Surfacing Materials
9390: Miscellaneous Fabricated Nonmetallic Materials

Group 94: Nonmetallic Crude Materials
9410: Crude Grades of Plant Materials
9420: Fibers: Vegetable, Animal, and Synthetic
9430: Miscellaneous Crude Animal Products, Inedible
9440: Miscellaneous Crude Agricultural and Forestry Products
9450: Nonmetallic Scrap, Except Textile

Group 95: Metal Bars, Sheets, and Shapes
9505: Nonelectrical Wires
9510: Bars and Rods 
9515: Plate, Sheet, Strip, Foil, and Leaf 
9520: Structural Shapes
9525: Wire, Nonelectrical, Nonferrous Base Metal
9530: Bars and Rods, Nonferrous Base Metal
9535: Plate, Sheet, Strip, and Foil; Nonferrous Base Metal 
9540: Structural Shapes, Nonferrous Base Metal
9545: Plate, Sheet, Strip, Foil, and Wire: Precious Metal

Group 96: Ores, Minerals, and Their Primary Products
9610: Ores
9620: Minerals, Natural and Synthetic
9630: Additive Metal Materials
9640: Iron and Steel Primary and Semi-finished Products
9650: Nonferrous Base Metal Refinery and Intermediate Forms
9660: Precious Metals Primary Forms
9670: Iron and Steel Scrap
9680: Nonferrous Scrap

Group 99: Miscellaneous
9905: Signs, Advertising Displays, and Identification Plates
9910: Jewelry
9915: Collectors' and/or Historical Items
9920: Smokers' Articles and Matches
9925: Ecclesiastical Equipment, Furnishings, and Supplies
9930: Memorials; Cemetery and Mortuary Equipment and Supplies
9999: Miscellaneous Items.

See also
National Codification Bureau
Federal Stock Number
National Stock Number
NATO Stock Number
National Item Identification Number
NATO Item Identification Number

References

WIKILEAKS.ORG Federal Supply Group
AC/135 FAQ
BDEC-Online
Federal Supply Group (FSG)

Military logistics of the United States
NATO Standardization Agreements
Identifiers